Scanning voltage microscopy (SVM), sometimes also called nanopotentiometry, is a scientific experimental technique based on atomic force microscopy.  A conductive probe, usually only a few nanometers wide at the tip, is placed in full contact with an operational electronic or optoelectronic sample.  By connecting the probe to a high-impedance voltmeter and rastering over the sample's surface, a map of the electric potential can be acquired.  SVM is generally nondestructive to the sample although some damage may occur to the sample or the probe if the pressure required to maintain good electrical contact is too high.  If the input impedance of the voltmeter is sufficiently large, the SVM probe should not perturb the operation of the operational sample.

Applications
SVM is particularly well suited to analyzing microelectronic devices (such as transistors or diodes) or quantum electronic devices (such as quantum well diode lasers) directly because nanometer spatial resolution is possible.  SVM can also be used to verify theoretical simulation of complex electronic devices.

For example, the potential profile across the quantum well structure of a diode laser can be mapped and analyzed; such a profile could indicate the electron and hole distributions where light is generated and could lead to improved laser designs.

Scanning gate microscopy
In a similar technique, scanning gate microscopy (SGM), the probe is oscillated at some natural frequency some fixed distance above the sample with an applied voltage relative to the sample. The image is constructed from the X,Y position of the probe and the conductance of the sample, with no significant current passing through the probe, which acts as a local gate. The image is interpreted as a map of the sample's sensitivity to gate voltage. A lock-in amplifier aids noise reduction by filtering through only the amplitude oscillations that match the probe's vibration frequency. Applications include imaging defect sites in carbon nanotubes and doping profiles in nanowires.

References

Scanning probe microscopy